Squalidus minor is a species of cyprinid fish endemic to Hainan in China.

References

Squalidus
Taxa named by Isokichi Harada
Fish described in 1943